The 2013 season was Tromsø's 11th consecutive year in Tippeligaen, and their 27th season in the top flight of Norwegian football, a run that came to an end as they were relegated to the Adeccoligaen after finishing 15th. They also participated in the 2013 Norwegian Football Cup, reaching the Fourth Round before defeat to Rosenborg. They also played in the 2013–14 UEFA Europa League, reaching the Group Stage before finishing bottom behind Tottenham Hotspur, Anzhi Makhachkala and Sheriff Tiraspol. It was their first season under the management of Agnar Christensen, but he was replaced by Steinar Nilsen on 1 October 2013.

Transfers

Winter

In:

 

Out:

Summer

In:

Out:

Competitions

Tippeligaen

Results summary

Results by round

Results

Table

Norwegian Cup

Europa League

Qualifying phase

Group stage

Squad statistics

Appearances and goals

|-
|colspan="14"|Players away from Tromsø on loan:
|-
|colspan="14"|Players who left Tromsø during the season:

|}

Goal scorers

Disciplinary record

Notes
Inter Baku played their home match at Bayil Stadium, Baku as their own Shafa Stadium does not meet UEFA criteria.

References

Tromsø IL seasons
Tromso